The Golden Glove is a 2019 internationally co-produced horror drama film directed by Fatih Akin. It was selected to compete for the Golden Bear at the 69th Berlin International Film Festival. The film is an adaptation of Heinz Strunk's eponymous novel and tells the story of the German serial killer Fritz Honka who murdered four women between 1970 and 1975 and hid their body parts in his apartment. The Golden Glove is named after the pub in the red-light district of Hamburg where the disfigured alcoholic Honka met his victims. The Golden Glove is the first film by Fatih Akin to receive an 18 rating in Germany.

Plot
In 1970, alcoholic night watchman Fritz Honka murders Gertraud Bräuer, a prostitute, in his squalid Hamburg apartment. He carves up the body, getting rid of some parts by throwing them away in a suitcase, while the rest are kept in an improvised locker in his wall. The police find the suitcase but cannot identify the culprit.

In 1974, Fritz sees schoolgirl Petra Schulz hanging out with her classmate, Willi. Despite their short encounter, Petra becomes a recurrent protagonist of Fritz's sexual fantasies. Fritz spends nearly all his free time at The Golden Glove pub, often soliciting prostitutes that reject him in disgust. One night Fritz brings home Gerda Voss, a vagrant, who is allowed to pass the night conditional on having sex with him. The next day however, Fritz allows her to stay in exchange for sex and housework, as well as a signed contract of being introduced to her attractive daughter, Rosi.

After having lunch with Fritz's recently divorced brother Siggi, Fritz and Gerda go to the pub to meet Rosi. Gerda finally confesses that Rosi and her are completely estranged and that she will not be coming. Outraged, Fritz shatters his glass and begins bleeding. While he is washing himself in the bathroom, an evangelist offers Gerda rehabilitation, which she gladly accepts. With Gerda gone, Fritz approaches three alcoholic women: Inge, Herta, and Anna. As a fight breaks out at the pub, they tag along with him, although Herta passes out on the street and is left lying there. Upon arrival, Fritz asks the women to perform oral sex on each other. While Anna is too drunk to care, Inge adamantly refuses and Fritz beats her up, but she manages to escape. To vent out his frustration, Fritz kills Anna by smashing her head against a table. Her body is also quartered and put in the locker.

The following morning, a still-intoxicated Fritz is run over by a van. He survives and visits the pub for the last time before giving up drinking altogether. Now consistently sober, he takes up a night shift as a watchman at an office complex, where he meets cleaner Helga Denningsen, whom he finds attractive. At Helga's birthday party, Fritz is disillusioned to learn that she is married to a man named Erich. When Erich leaves, a saddened Helga reveals to Fritz that her husband has been unemployed for months and now resorts to leech off her. After sharing a few drinks, Fritz relapses and attempts to rape Helga at their next encounter, but she flees.

Fritz is back at the pub and brings another prostitute, Frida, to his home. While having sex, he beats her up for laughing at his erectile dysfunction. Once Fritz falls asleep, Frida begins robbing the apartment. In retaliation, she rubs Fritz's genitals with spicy mustard. When he wakes up in pain, she kicks him in the groin and insults him. A violent fight breaks out, with Frida being strangled, battered, and cut up by Fritz. In the following days, he lures Ruth to his apartment, who suffers the same fate.

One night, Willi convinces Petra to go to The Golden Glove in order to win her over. In the bathroom, Willi unintentionally provokes an older man, who urinates on him. Humiliated, he locks himself at a stall and refuses to get out when Petra comes to check on him, asking her to leave without him. Fritz notices Petra and follows her through the streets, only to discover that his apartment has caught fire. Firefighters find the corpses and Fritz is immediately arrested.

Cast

Reception

Critical response

At the 69th Berlin International Film Festival, The Golden Glove received mostly negative reviews from critics. Most German critics described it as a failed or inadequate attempt to adapt the novel and criticized Akin for making a nauseating horror film out of Strunk's artistic presentation of the events. Its consensus reads, "Grim to a fault, The Golden Glove embarks on a well-crafted but deeply unsavory descent into the depraved mind and rank brutality of a serial killer." On Metacritic, the film has a weighted average score of 38 out of 100, based on 15 critics, indicating "generally unfavorable reviews."

The Guardians Peter Bradshaw awarded the film two out of five stars, while commending Dassler's performance and technical accomplishments, he criticized the film for its realistic and brutal violence, and felt it was a pointless recreation of the events it depicts. David Ehrlich of Indiewire gave it a D and called it "disgusting" and "one of the most vile serial killer movies ever made." Pat Brown of Slant Magazine called the film "ugly" and "hollow," feeling that the film was "mostly an excuse to stage some unsettling murder scenes in the grimy underbelly of Hamburg." Carlos Aguilar of The Los Angeles Times echoed this sentiment, stating that Akin pushed the film's repulsiveness to its limits, depicting little psychological substance. Ben Sachs from The Chicago Reader called it "virtually unwatchable," panning the film's soundtrack, imagery, and brutal violence. The Austin Chronicles Richard Whittaker rated the film two and a half out of a possible five stars, noting that the film's brutality, self-awareness, and director Akin's adherence the facts of the case made the film "desperately grueling." Even so, Whittaker praised Dassler's performance and the film's effective depiction of 1970s Hamburg.

Conversely, Spleeny Dotson of Starburst Magazine gave it six out of ten stars, commending the film for effectively capturing "the bleak hopelessness of the seamy side of the 1970s," as well as the makeup design and Dassler's performance. Dotson however, criticized the film's brutal violence as "repetitive and predictable" as well as its failure to explain the reason behind Honka's killings. Bloody Disgusting's Meagan Navarro rated it a score of four and a half out of five, calling it "a marvel of technical filmmaking," praising the film for its editing, production design, makeup effects and Akin's direction.

References

External links
 
 
 

2019 films
2019 drama films
2019 thriller drama films
2010s serial killer films
2010s German-language films
German serial killer films
German thriller drama films
German horror films
Films directed by Fatih Akin
Cultural depictions of male serial killers
Cultural depictions of German men
Biographical films about serial killers
Films based on German novels
Films set in West Germany
Warner Bros. films
2010s German films